Filippo Savini (born 2 May 1985 in Faenza) is an Italian professional road bicycle racer for UCI Continental team .

Palmarès 

 2005
 1st, Stage 5, Giro delle Valli Cuneesi nelle Alpi del Mare
 2006
 1st, Memorial Danilo Furlan
 1st, Circuito Internazionale di Caneva
 2008
 1st, Stage 8, Tour de Langkawi
 1st, Stage 4, Presidential Cycling Tour of Turkey
2011
 1st, Stage 3, Vuelta a Castilla y León

External links 

1985 births
Living people
Sportspeople from the Province of Ravenna
Italian male cyclists
Presidential Cycling Tour of Turkey stage winners
Cyclists from Emilia-Romagna